Undercover is an album by Paul Taylor which was released in February 2000 on N2K Records. The album got to No. 6  on the Billboard Top Jazz Albums chart and No. 27 on the Billboard Independent Albums chart.

Track listing

Credits

Musicians
Dino Esposito - drums, keyboards  
Kurt Jackson - drums, keyboards, vocals
Munyungo Jackson - percussion
Brian Monroney - guitar
Scot Rammer - drums, keyboards
Jimi Randolph - drums, keyboards, (trumpet, flugelhorn, horn arrangements)
Paul Taylor - keyboards, saxophone, soprano saxophone
Michael Thompson - guitar (electric)

Production
Michael Angelo - mixing  
Scott Blockland - mixing
Rick Camp - engineer, mixing
Dino Esposito - producer, engineer, MIDI
Russ Freeman - producer, engineer, mixing, production engineer
Carl Griffin - executive producer
Andi Howard - executive producer
Kurt Jackson  - producer, drum programming
Hyman Katz - executive producer
Paul Klingberg - engineer
Bill Meyers  - producer
Oji Pierce - producer, engineer, mixing  
Scot Rammer - producer, engineer, MIDI
Jimi Randolph - programming, drum programming
Michael Angelo Saulsberry - producer, engineer, mixing
Paul Taylor - producer
Nick Sodano - mixing
Maurice White - producer

Charts

References

2000 albums
Albums produced by Maurice White
Jazz albums by American artists